The 1893 Track Cycling World Championships were the inaugural world championships for track cycling. Before then there had been events described as world championships but without ratification by a world cycling authority. The creation of the International Cycling Association in 1892 made internationally recognised championships possible.

They took place in Chicago, United States. There were three events: sprint, stayers' race (motor-paced) and a 10 km, now classified as a scratch race. The rules allowed for a team race but it was not held. Races were held only for amateurs. Winners received a gold medal and all other participants a silver.

The USA took two of the three gold medals. The table below shows the position had gold, silver and bronze medals been awarded.

Medal summary

Medal table

External links
Bike Cult Book Track Racing Champions
Mémoire du cyclisme

 
Ica Track Cycling World Championships
UCI Track Cycling World Championships by year
International cycle races hosted by the United States
ICA Track Cycling
August 1893 sports events
Sports competitions in Chicago
1890s in Chicago